Ocean's  is a series of heist films. Beginning with the 1960 Rat Pack film Ocean's 11, the series has seen mixed to favorable critical reception and substantial commercial success. After the 1960 film, a trilogy was released from 2001 to 2007, often cited as defining its genre and leading to a proliferation and commercialization of heist films throughout the world. The most commercially successful was the first film, Ocean's Eleven (2001). It established the ensemble cast of George Clooney as Danny Ocean, Matt Damon as Linus Caldwell, and Brad Pitt as Rusty Ryan. A long list of supporting cast members maintain the trilogy. The first sequel, Ocean's Twelve, was released in 2004, with the final film, Ocean's Thirteen, following in 2007. An all-female spin-off titled Ocean's 8 was released in 2018.

Origin 
The Ocean's film series was inspired by the 1960 heist film Ocean's 11 directed by Lewis Milestone and starring five of the Rat Pack: Peter Lawford, Frank Sinatra, Dean Martin, Sammy Davis Jr., and Joey Bishop.

Films

Ocean's Eleven (2001)

Master thief Danny Ocean (George Clooney), just out of prison, plans an elaborate Las Vegas three-casino-heist to win back his ex-wife, Tess (Julia Roberts). To that end, he recruits ten other thieves and con men to pull off the complex job, eventually stealing US$160 million.

Ocean's Twelve (2004)
 
Ocean's crew is blackmailed by the casino owner they stole from—Terry Benedict (Andy Garcia)—into paying him just over $198 million (their loot plus interest). The team is given two weeks to come up with the money so they travel to Europe to execute three heists.

Ocean's Thirteen (2007)

Ocean and his crew plan to rig a new casino's opening night to inflict ruinous losses after its ruthless owner Willy Bank (Al Pacino) double-crosses one of the gang, with plans to ruin his life.

Ocean's 8 (2018)

Soderbergh and George Clooney initially downplayed the possibility of an Ocean's Fourteen or subsequent sequels after Bernie Mac's death in 2008. Several years later, a new Ocean's Eleven spin-off with an all-female cast led by Sandra Bullock as the sister of George Clooney's Danny Ocean was put in development, conceived by producer Jerry Weintraub, Soderbergh and Clooney. Olivia Milch wrote the screenplay, and Gary Ross directed the film. Helena Bonham Carter, Cate Blanchett, Mindy Kaling, Anne Hathaway, Rihanna, Nora "Awkwafina" Lum and Sarah Paulson star in the film. The film was released in the United States on June 8, 2018.

Future

Untitled prequel film
In May 2022, a prequel film set in '60s-era Europe was revealed to be in development. The story may reportedly connect to and incorporate elements from the original film. The project will not be a reboot, but will be set within the established Ocean's franchise. Margot Robbie will star in and produce the project, while Jay Roach will serve as director with a script written by Carrie Solomon. Tom Ackerley and Roach will additionally serve as producers. The project will be a joint-venture production between Warner Bros. Pictures, LuckyChap Entertainment, and Village Roadshow. Principal photography is tentatively scheduled for spring 2023. In August 2022, Ryan Gosling entered early negotiations to co-star in the film, alongside Robbie. Principal photography is scheduled to commence on March 6, 2023.

Potential sequel
A sequel to Ocean's Thirteen had been discussed as a possibility, up until the death of Bernie Mac. However, in June 2021, Don Cheadle revealed that Steven Soderbergh had been working on the concept of a sequel film. In July 2021, Matt Damon also expressed interest in returning to the franchise, while stating that the project is up to Soderbergh.

Cast

Additional crew and production details

Reception

Box office performance

Critical response

See also
 List of films set in Las Vegas

References

Warner Bros. Pictures franchises
 
American film series
Film series introduced in 2001
Action film series